Shanhe is a town under the administration of Wuchang, Heilongjiang, China. , it has 6 residential communities and 13 villages under its administration.

References 

Township-level divisions of Heilongjiang
Wuchang, Heilongjiang